The 1898 Fairmount Wheatshockers football team was an American football team that represented Fairmount College (now known as Wichita State University) as an independent during the 1898 college football season. They played in one game, a 5–0 loss against .

Schedule

References

Fairmount
Wichita State Shockers football seasons
College football winless seasons
Fairmount Wheatshockers football